The Golden Age or The Age of Gold, Op. 22, is a ballet in three acts and six scenes by Dmitri Shostakovich to a libretto by Alexander Ivanovsky. Choreographed by Vasili Vainonen (first act), Leonid Jacobson (second act), and V. Chesnakov (third act), it premiered on 26 October 1930 at the Kirov Theatre.

The work was performed eighteen times and was initially censored due to its inclusion of modern European dance styles.

Plot summary
The ballet is a satirical take on the political and cultural change in 1920s Europe. It follows a Soviet football (soccer) team in a Western city where they come into contact with many politically incorrect antagonistic characters such as the Diva, the Fascist, the Agent Provocateur, the Negro and others. The team falls victim to match rigging, police harassment, and unjust imprisonment by the evil bourgeoisie. The team is freed from jail when the local workers overthrow their capitalist overlords. The ballet ends with a dance of solidarity between the workers and the football team.

Shostakovich himself was a very keen football follower, and is said to have coined the expression "Football is the ballet of the masses".

Sections
Prelude
Act I, Scene 1, The Golden Age of Industry Exhibition: Procession of the Guests of Honour
Act I, Scene 1, The Golden Age of Industry Exhibition: Inspection of the Display Windows
Act I, Scene 1, The Golden Age of Industry Exhibition: Demonstration of Important Exhibits - Appearance of the Soviet Football Team
Act I, Scene 1, The Golden Age of Industry Exhibition: Magician-Advertising Agent - Dance of the Hindu
Act I, Scene 1, The Golden Age of Industry Exhibition: Boxing as an Advertising Stunt
Act I, Scene 1, The Golden Age of Industry Exhibition: Scandal during the Boxing Match - Entrance of the Police
Act I, Scene 2, Exhibition Hall: Dance of the Golden Youths
Act I, Scene 2, Exhibition Hall: Dance of Diva: Adagio
Act I, Scene 2, Exhibition Hall: Appearance of the Soviet Football Team and Diva's Variations
Act I, Scene 2, Exhibition Hall: Soviet Dance
Act I, Scene 2, Exhibition Hall: Diva asks the Leader of the Soviet Team to Dance with Her
Act I, Scene 2, Exhibition Hall: Dance and Scene of the Diva and the Fascist
Act I, Scene 2, Exhibition Hall: Dance of the Black Man and 2 Soviet Football Players
Act I, Scene 2, Exhibition Hall: The Supposed Terrorist, "The Hand of Moscow"
Act I, Scene 2, Exhibition Hall: General Confusion - The Embarrassment of the Fascists
Act I, Scene 2, Exhibition Hall: A Rare Case of Mass Hysteria
Act I, Scene 2, Exhibition Hall: Conversation between the Director of the Exhibition and the Fascist
Act I, Scene 2, Exhibition Hall: Foxtrot ... foxtrot ... foxtrot
Act II, Scene 3, A Street in the Same City: Mime of the Agents Provocateurs, Provocation and Arrest: Galop
Act II, Scene 4, Workers' Stadium: Procession of the Workers to the Stadium - Dance of the Young Pioneers - Sports Games
Act II, Scene 4, Workers' Stadium: Football March
Act II, Scene 4, Workers' Stadium: Intermezzo, "Everybody amuses oneself in one's own way"
Act II, Scene 4, Workers' Stadium: Dance of the Western Komsomol Girl and 4 Sportsmen
Act II, Scene 4, Workers' Stadium: Sports Contests - Joint Sports Dance
Act II, Scene 4, Workers' Stadium: Scene and Exit of the Soviet Team
Act III: Entr'acte, "Tea for Two"
Act III, Scene 5, Music Hall: Chechotka, "Shoe Shine of the Highest Grade"
Act III, Scene 5, Music Hall: Tango
Act III, Scene 5, Music Hall: Polka, "Once upon a Time in Geneva" - Polka, "Angel of Peace"
Act III, Scene 5, Music Hall: The Touching Coalition of the Classes, slightly fraudulent
Act III, Scene 5, Music Hall: Entrance of Diva and the Fascist - Their Dance
Act III, Scene 5, Music Hall: Can-can
Act III, Scene 6, Prison Building: Prelude
Act III, Scene 6, Prison Building: Scene of the Freeing of the Prisoners
Act III, Scene 6, Prison Building: Total Unveiling of the Conspiracy - The Bourgeoisie in Panic
Act III, Scene 6, Prison Building: Final Dance of Solidarity

Instrumentation
Woodwinds: two flutes (2nd doubling piccolo), two oboes (2nd doubling cor anglais), three clarinets (2nd doubling Eb clarinet, 3rd doubling bass clarinet), two saxophones doubling on soprano and tenor, two bassoons (2nd doubling double bassoon).

Brass: four French horns, three trumpets, three trombones, euphonium, tuba.

Percussion: timpani, triangle, woodblock, tambourine, flexatone, ratchet, snare drums, cymbals, bass drum, tam-tam, xylophone, bayan, harmonium.

Strings: violins, violas, cellos, double basses, banjo.

Suite
Shostakovich extracted a suite from the ballet, Op. 22a, in four movements:
Introduction (Allegro non troppo)
Adagio
Polka (Allegretto)
Danse

The Polka was reused as the second of his Two Pieces for String Quartet in 1931. He also arranged the Polka for solo piano (Op. 22b) and piano four hands (Op. 22c), in 1935 and 1962 respectively.

Revivals
In 1982, Yury Grigorovich and Isaak Glikman revived the ballet with a new libretto. Grigorovich also chose to integrate other works of Shostakovich into the score.
In 1983, he created The Golden Age for Irek Mukhamedov, who defined the role of Boris, the young workers' leader, for successive generations of Bolshoi dancers. They moved the action to the USSR in the 1920s to a restaurant called "The Golden Age". Conflict unfolded between the Soviet Komsomol and the gang. The premiere took place on 4 November 1982 in Moscow's Bolshoi Theatre.

In 2006, the playwright Konstantin Uchitel wrote a new libretto for the same music. The action was set in present day. Old man and old woman meet and remember their youth. The premiere took place on 28 June 2006 at the Mariinsky Theatre.

References

Ballets by Vasili Vainonen
Ballets by Leonid Jacobson
Ballets by Dmitri Shostakovich
Suites by Dmitri Shostakovich
1930 compositions
1930 ballet premieres
Ballets premiered at the Bolshoi Theatre